Didang railway station is a railway station in Didang Subdistrict, Yuecheng District, Shaoxing, Zhejiang, China. It is an intermediate stop on the Xiaoshan–Ningbo railway and is served by trains on the Shaoxing Urban Rail Line service.

Construction started in late 2019. The station opened on 30 December 2022.

References 

Railway stations in Zhejiang
Railway stations in China opened in 2022